This is the discography of South Korean boy band, Super Junior, produced and managed by SM Entertainment. Super Junior has formed five sub-groups, which target different markets. Super Junior-T, for example, brought influence to the younger generation on trot-styled music, and Super Junior-M is credited as an influential group in the Chinese music industry.

The group has released twelve studio albums, two compilation albums, two extended plays, six live albums, and two single albums. The group also contributed in a total seven soundtracks and sixteen video albums. The releases below are music records officially released by Super Junior, although the group has also unofficially-released productions, such as opening themes for radio shows and television shows.

Their fourth album Bonamana is listed as the best-selling album of 2010 with 200,193 copies sold, and the repackaged version at ninth at 99,355 copies. On April 12, 2012, Gaon Chart announced that, up till the end of March 2012, their fifth studio album, Mr. Simple has sold a cumulative total of 548,164 copies in South Korea, the first to exceed half a million in four years in South Korea, hence making it the highest-selling album of their career.


Albums

Studio albums

Reissue albums

Compilation albums

Single albums

Live albums

Video albums

Extended plays

Singles

Korean singles

Japanese singles

Collaborations

Soundtrack appearances

Other charted songs

Other appearances

Music videos

See also
 List of songs recorded by Super Junior
 Solo
 Yesung discography
 Kim Ryeowook discography
 Cho Kyu-hyun discography
 Subgroups
 Super Junior-K.R.Y.#Discography
 Super Junior-T#Discography
 Super Junior-M#Discography
 Super Junior-H#Discography
 Super Junior-D&E discography

Notes

References

Super Junior
Discographies of South Korean artists
K-pop music group discographies